Zavajer (also Romanized as Zavājer; also known as Zavadzhir and Zivār) is a village in Howmeh Rural District, in the Central District of Khodabandeh County, Zanjan Province, Iran. At the 2006 census, its population was 808, in 198 families.

References 

Populated places in Khodabandeh County